Nokia 105 (2019), also known as Nokia 105 4th Edition, is a Nokia-branded feature phone made by HMD Global. It was unveiled on 24 July 2019 alongside the Nokia 220 4G and released in September 2019. The phone is available in blue, pink and black.

It uses the Series 30+ operating system. Connectivity is restricted to 2G services.

With some versions of this new model, the T9 automatic dictionary is somewhat limited.

The phone has many games accessible from the main menu, some of which can be played only a few times, then requiring purchase.

References 

105 (2019)
Mobile phones introduced in 2019
Mobile phones with user-replaceable battery